The Thailand national rugby sevens team is a minor national sevens side. They have competed in the Hong Kong Sevens since the 1980s.

Sri Lanka Rugby 7s
{| class="wikitable"
|-
!width=40|Year
!width=165|Cup
!width=165|Plate
!width=165|Bowl
|-
|1999||||||
|-
|2000|||||| 
|-
|2001||||||
|-
|2002||||||
|-
|2003||||||
|-
|2004||||||
|-
|2005||||||
|-
|2006||||||
|-
|2007||||||
|-
|2008||||||
|}

Rugby at the 1998 Asian Games
Group B matches -

December 7

Rugby at the 2002 Asian Games
Group A matches -

September 30

References
 McLaren, Bill A Visit to Hong Kong in Starmer-Smith, Nigel & Robertson, Ian (eds) The Whitbread Rugby World '90 (Lennard Books, 1989)

See also
 Rugby union in Thailand

Rugby union in Thailand
Thailand national rugby union team
National rugby sevens teams